is a river in Hokkaido, Japan.

Course
The Mitsuishi River originates at Mount Setaushi in the Hidaka Mountains and flows roughly south to southwest. The river flows into a reservoir at the Mitsuishi Dam. It then continues until it reaches the Pacific Ocean at Mitsuishi in Shinhidaka, Hokkaido.

Tributaries

 (left)
 (right)
Bebō River (left)
 (left)
　(right)
 (left)
 (left)
 or Ninth River on the Right (right)

References

External links

Rivers of Hokkaido
Rivers of Japan
Shinhidaka, Hokkaido